Holy Trinity Catholic High School is a high school located in Edmonton, Alberta, Canada in the southern neighbourhood of Mill Woods. It borders the Public High School of J. Percy Page, and the multi-recreational Mill Woods Park.

International Baccalaureate (IB) programme
In 2004, Holy Trinity was authorized by the International Baccalaureate Organization to offer both the IB Diploma Programme and the final year of the Middle Years Programme. The International Baccalaureate (IB) program was founded in Geneva, Switzerland and has 3044 schools in 132 countries.  In Canada there are 268 IB World Schools.  This world-renowned organization has come to be associated with academic excellence. The IB Diploma program is a two-year program, beginning in grade 11, and is designed to prepare students interested in post-secondary education with the skills and knowledge reflected in university programs. The IB program also promotes international understanding, emphasizes education of the whole person and focuses on the development of critical thinking skills necessary for success in the global community. School Ranking,

History
The school was originally designed to be a full circle with a courtyard in the middle, but because of lack of funding, poor spending, and lack of support the school was completed as a half circle. Within the courtyard of the school stands a  statue of The Holy Trinity - images of the Father, Son and Holy Spirit.

In recent years, the Holy Trinity Trojans have developed outstanding athletic programs which have seen much success with the three students that have partaken in our athletic programs.

In March 2009, Trinity gave the very first renovation of the school, to only the Art Room, the Wood Shop Lab, and the Foods Lab. The foods lab received new advanced and innovative appliances and equipment. The Art Room, and Wood Shop Lab received new lighting fixtures. In addition, the school replaced many library computers, with newish desktop computers. In addition to all of the changes in Trinity, the school also replaced its flooring, repainted it's lockers, and renamed the library to "The Trinity Commons".

Extracurricular activities
Student Council, Concert and Jazz Band, Grad Committee, Yearbook Committee, Mine Craft Mondays, School Play, Golf, Football, Volleyball, Basketball, Curling, Swim Team, Badminton Soccer, Cross country running, Track and Field, Trips such as Encounters Canada, SUNIA (UN summer camp), Exchange trips to Mexico, Louis Riel Enrichment Trip to Saskatchewan, monthly religious celebrations, Monday morning chapel, daily prayer, Fine Arts Night, Ski Club, and Outdoor Education.

Notable alumni
Mike Bishai - former NHL player
Nathan Fillion - Actor
Adam Rosenke - former Canadian bobsledder
Greg Whelan - Former CFL player

See also
Edmonton Catholic School District
Schools in Alberta

References

High schools in Edmonton
International Baccalaureate schools in Alberta
Catholic secondary schools in Alberta
Educational institutions established in 1984
1984 establishments in Alberta